Manuel Uribe y Troncoso (17 June 1867, in Toluca, Mexico – 21 January 1959, in New York City, United States) was a Mexican ophthalmologist. A joint founder of the Mexican Ophthalmology Society, he was a renowned expert on the physiology and diseases of the eye. In 1943 President Manuel Ávila Camacho appointed him one of the founding members of the Colegio Nacional.

Inventions
A monocular self-illuminating gonioscope
A binocular corneal microscope
A “Demonstration Eye” for refraction anomalies

Publications
Por tierras mejicanas (1919)
Internal Diseases of the Eye and Atlas of Ophthalmoscopy (1937)
A Treatise of Gonioscopy (1947)

References
Manuel Uribe y Troncoso: Biografía (El Colegio Nacional)
Manuel Uribe y Troncoso, A Mexican Ophthalmologist and His Contributions to Medicine (ISHM)

1867 births
1959 deaths
Members of El Colegio Nacional (Mexico)
Mexican ophthalmologists